Pokharathok may refer to:
Pokharathok, Arghakhanchi - town in Nepal
Pokharathok, Palpa - village in Nepal